Emilio Pacheco was a football coach. He led the Philippines national football team in 1967 as its head coach at the Asian qualifiers for the men's football event of the 1968 Summer Olympics. He was succeeded by the Spanish coach Juan Cutillas in late 1967.

References

Filipino football head coaches
Philippines national football team managers